Sensitive Sources is the 16th studio album by Japanese R&B singer Toshinori Yonekura, released on October 21, 2009. It was his first album since 2007's Samurai Quality and his first physical release since moving to Universal Music Japan's label Universal Sigma.

The album includes the previously download-only singles "Hands," "Respect/Disrespect," "One Love -No Question-," and "Superwoman/Superman."

Track listing

References 

2009 albums
Toshinori Yonekura albums